"Where Do We Go from Here?" is a song by American actress and singer Vanessa Williams. Produced by David Foster, it was featured in the 1996 film Eraser, in which Williams co-stars with Arnold Schwarzenegger, though not included on its soundtrack album. The song would later appear on Williams' 1998 greatest hits album Greatest Hits: The First Ten Years. In the US, the single peaked at number 71 on the Billboard Hot 100 and climbed to number five on the Billboard Hot Adult Contemporary Tracks chart.

Critical reception
Larry Flick from Billboard wrote, "It's always a pleasure to hear Williams work her smooth style in a ballad setting. Time continues to treat her voice well, as evidenced by this theme song". He also noted, "She displays a warm and worldly quality within a wonderfully theatrical arrangement by David Foster. She soars with the verve of a young Shirley Bassey over brassy horn flourishes and a sweet undercurrent of orchestral strings." Alan Jones from Music Week described the song as "a lushly-orchestrated ballad". He added, "Williams sings it immaculately and deserves to have another hit to sit alongside Save The Best For Last but, while something og an emotional maelstrom, the song is also rather subtle and could easily escape attention — although it would probably be a Top 10 hit in the hands of Celine Dion."

Music video

The official music video for the song was directed by Andy Morahan.

Charts

References

1995 songs
1996 singles
Mercury Records singles
Music videos directed by Andy Morahan
Songs written for films
Songs written by Linda Thompson (actress)
Songs written by David Foster
Vanessa Williams songs